The Morane-Saulnier MS.1500 Épervier (en: Sparrowhawk) was a 1950s French two-seat ground attack and reconnaissance aircraft. Designed and built by Morane-Saulnier to meet a French Air Force requirement, it did not enter production.

Development
Designed to meet a requirement for a tactical reconnaissance and counter-insurgency aircraft for use by the French Air Force in Algeria the Epervier was a tandem two-seat low-wing cantilever monoplane. Powered by a ) Turbomeca Bastan turboprop the MS.1500 had a fixed tailwheel landing gear. The prototype first flew on the 12 May 1958 powered by a ) Turbomeca Marcadau turboprop.  A second prototype was built but the type did not enter production.

Specifications (Epervier with Bastan engine)

References

Bibliography

Further reading

1950s French attack aircraft
Epervier
Single-engined tractor aircraft
Single-engined turboprop aircraft
Aircraft first flown in 1958